Terence Swinscoe (born 31 August 1934) is an English former professional footballer who played in the Football League for Mansfield Town.

References

1934 births
Living people
English footballers
Association football defenders
English Football League players
Spalding United F.C. players
Stockport County F.C. players
Mansfield Town F.C. players